Tabernaemontana psorocarpa is a species of plant in the family Apocynaceae. It is found in West Africa.

References

psorocarpa